The Ceuta Football Federation (FFCE) is responsible for administering football in the Autonomous City of Ceuta. They are not directly affiliated with FIFA or CAF or UEFA. Till now there has been no attempt to select a team to represent the whole Spanish exclave in North Africa.

88 football clubs are administered in Ceuta and also the amateur autonomous team that plays the Spanish stage of the UEFA Regions' Cup. 

External links
Territorial Federations in Spain
La Federación de Fútbol de Ceuta sanciona a 88 clubes

Football Federation
Spanish football associations
Sports organizations established in 1999
1999 establishments in Spain